Drina maneia is a species of butterfly belonging to the lycaenid family described by William Chapman Hewitson in 1863. It is found in  the Indomalayan realm.

Subspecies
Drina maneia maneia (southern Thailand, Peninsular Malaysia, Singapore, Sumatra)
Drina maneia borromeorum Schröder & Treadaway, 1991 (Philippines: Tawi-Tawi)

References

External links
Drina at Markku Savela's Lepidoptera and Some Other Life Forms

Drina (butterfly)
Butterflies described in 1863
Butterflies of Asia
Taxa named by William Chapman Hewitson